Brian Borrello is an American artist. He is based in Portland, Oregon, United States.

Works
 Guns in the Hands of Artists
 People's Bike Library of Portland, Portland, Oregon (2009)
 Silicon Forest (sculpture), Portland, Oregon (2003)

References

Living people
Artists from Portland, Oregon
Year of birth missing (living people)
American people of Italian descent